Naomi Michelle Miller was an American woman from Texas who disappeared in 2005, and was found buried underneath the old San Angelo speedway on March 8, 2017.

Disappearance
Miller went missing in 2005, but was not reported missing until December 2015. Her relatives have said that she "just took off" after a family fight one night, which Tom Green County Sheriff David Jones announced during a press conference with local media. He also stated that none of her personal or banking records indicated any activity.

Investigation and aftermath
The first suspect in the death of Miller was her ex-husband Robert Miller, and the police also arrested a second suspect in the death named Ludonna Gail Yoder, the girlfriend of Robert Miller who said that she disposed of Miller's body the night that she was murdered in a shallow grave at Miller's previous house, which was in Tom Green County. Miller's parents were contacted about her murder in 2005.

Her ex-husband Robert faced charges in her death, and both he and his current wife named LuDonna Miller (also known as LuDonna Gail Yoder) pleaded guilty and were sentenced to 38 years in prison.

See also
List of kidnappings
List of solved missing person cases

References

2000s missing person cases
2005 in Texas
2005 murders in the United States
2017 in Texas
American murder victims
Crime in Texas
Female murder victims
Formerly missing people
History of Texas
History of women in Texas
Kidnapped American people
Missing person cases in Texas
People murdered in Texas
Violence against women in the United States